Annette Meeks (born April 12, 1960) is a Minnesota Republican politician and a member of the state's Metropolitan Council. She was the 2010 endorsed Republican candidate for lieutenant governor, running with gubernatorial candidate Tom Emmer.

Biography
Meeks pursued a degree at the University of Minnesota in Minneapolis, and also graduated from the American Campaign Academy in Washington, D.C. She served as deputy chief of staff for House Speaker Newt Gingrich during his time in office. She later served as chief executive officer of the Center of the American Experiment, a conservative think tank, and as the vice chair of the Republican Party of Minnesota. She is the founder and CEO of the Freedom Foundation of Minnesota.

Meeks was appointed to Minnesota's Metropolitan Council in 2003 by Governor Tim Pawlenty. She was reappointed to a second four-year term in 2007. She served as vice chair of the Council's Community Development and Transportation Committees. She is no longer a member of the Met Council.

On April 28, 2010, state representative and gubernatorial candidate Tom Emmer named Meeks as his running mate. It was noted that she had previously argued that the position of lieutenant governor should be abolished.

References

External links
Annette Meeks Metropolitan Council Biography
"Annette Meeks, The True Believer" - City Pages 5/28/2008
"Jack Meeks, The Lifer" - City Pages 5/28/2008

1960 births
Living people
University of Minnesota alumni
Politicians from Minneapolis
Minnesota Republicans
Women in Minnesota politics
21st-century American women